Ralph Michael Monsalve Pertsinidis (born 24 January 1987) is a Venezuelan racing cyclist, who most recently rode for Venezuelan amateur team Venezuela Pais Futuro–Fina Arroz. He is the older brother of fellow racing cyclist Yonathan Monsalve.

Major results

2007
 3rd Clasico Corre por la Vida
 5th Road race, Pan American Road and Track Championships
2011
 9th Copa Federacion Venezolana De Ciclismo Corre Por La Vida
2013
 9th Road race, National Road Championships
2015
 5th Overall Vuelta a Venezuela
2017
 8th Road race, National Road Championships
2018
 1st  Road race, National Road Championships
2019
 5th Road race, National Road Championships
 7th Overall Vuelta Ciclista a Miranda
2020
 1st Stage 2 Vuelta al Táchira

References

External links

1987 births
Living people
Venezuelan male cyclists
People from Barinas (state)
Cyclists at the 2019 Pan American Games
Pan American Games competitors for Venezuela
20th-century Venezuelan people
21st-century Venezuelan people